Central High School (1860–1982) was a public high school in Minneapolis, Minnesota.

History
The school went through several phases. Central High was first established in 1860 when students of high-school age were added to Union Elementary. In 1864, the building was destroyed by fire and was rebuilt on the same site as Washington School, with grades K-12. A new building was erected in 1877, with the name changed to Central, on the corner of 4th Avenue South and 11th Street in downtown Minneapolis. Designed in Victorian Gothic style by Franklin Long and Charles Haglin, the building was described by Minneapolis architecture critic Larry Millett as "one of the most impressive buildings of its time in Minneapolis." It was expanded in 1886.

In 1913, the school moved again, to 4th Avenue South and 34th Street, where it remained until closing in 1982. The new building was designed in the Collegiate Gothic architectural style.

Minneapolis Public Schools closed Central, West and Marshall-University high schools in 1982. Central and West were demolished shortly after, except for their recently-built gyms.

Notable alumni
Cedric Adams, broadcaster
Eddie Albert, actor
Johnny Blanchard, New York Yankees catcher
Orville Freeman, Minnesota governor
Agnes Moore Fryberger, music educator
Paul Granlund, sculptor
Halsey Hall, sportswriter and broadcaster
James Hong, actor
John Kundla, basketball coach
George Leach, Minneapolis mayor
Rodney Lewis, professional football defensive back
Bobby Lyle, jazz musician
Bobby Marshall, first African-American to play in the NFL
Noel Neill, actress
Prince, musician
Sharon Sayles Belton, Minneapolis mayor
Eric Sevareid, journalist and broadcaster
Ann Sothern, actress
Paul Westerberg, musician (did not graduate)

References

Defunct schools in Minnesota
Educational institutions established in 1880
1880 establishments in Minnesota
1982 disestablishments in Minnesota
High schools in Minneapolis
Minneapolis Public Schools